Jai Siya Ram (or Jai Siyaram) is a Hindi expression, translating as "Glory to Sita and Rama". Sociologist Jan Breman states that it was used as "a greeting of welcome in the countryside since time immemorial".

Usage

Worship 

Jai Siya Ram is used while worshipping Ram and Sita. It is often used during the recital of Ramayana, Ramcharitmanas and Sunderkand. Many devotional songs with the theme Jai Siya Ram have been sung by singers such as Jagjit Singh, Mohammed Rafi among others. Similar songs have been sung in various regional languages. The chants of Jai Siya Ram are very common in religious places and gatherings, for example Kumbh Mela.

In politics 
On 5 August 2020, Prime Minister Narendra Modi started his Ram Mandir ground breaking ceremony speech with Jai Siyaram. He also urged the attendees to chant Jai Siyaram. Modi also said, "The call of Jai Siya Ram is resonating not only in the city of Lord Ram but throughout the world today. I express gratitude to all citizens of this nation, Indian diaspora across the world and all the devotees of Lord Ram on this pious occasion." 

Priyanka Gandhi also used the expression in a tweet related to Ram Mandir on 4 August 2020.

Other uses 
Slogans of Jai Siya Ram had also been chanted in the Supreme Court in 1992 by Vishva Hindu Parishad.

Each stanza of the Punjabi folk song, "Expectation of Today's Wife", starts with the line Jai Siya Ram, Jai Jai Siya Ram. During riots in Jaipur in the 1990s, the phrase was used to indicate that one is a Hindu.

References

Bibliography 

 
 
 
 

Rama
Vishva Hindu Parishad
Rashtriya Swayamsevak Sangh
Bharatiya Janata Party